Bruce Eligon is a Trinidadian former cricketer. He played three first-class matches for Trinidad and Tobago between 1965/66 and 1970/71.

References

External links
 

Year of birth missing (living people)
Living people
Trinidad and Tobago cricketers
Place of birth missing (living people)